Akmurun (Aqmoron) is a rural locality (a selo) and the administrative centre of Akmurunsky Selsoviet, Baymaksky District, Bashkortostan, Russia. The population was 1,430 as of 2010. There are 10 streets.

Geography 
Akmurun is located 20 km southwest of Baymak (the district's administrative centre) by road. Aktau is the nearest rural locality.

References 

Rural localities in Baymaksky District